The 2002 season is the Philadelphia Charge's second season competing in the Women's United Soccer Association league, the top division of women's soccer in the United States, and second competitive season. The team was coached by  Mark Krikorian.

Review

Club

Roster
The first-team roster of Philadelphia Charge.

Team management
{| class="wikitable" style="text-align:left;"
|-
! style="background:#da2736; color:#fff; border:2px solid #041c2c;"|Position
! style="background:#da2736; color:#fff; border:2px solid #041c2c;"|Staff Member
|-
| Head coach ||  Mark Krikorian
|-
| Assistant coach ||  Pia Sundhage
|-
| Assistant coach ||  John Natale
|-
| Goalkeeping coach ||  Paul Royal

Competition

Regular season

Results by round

Home/away results

Regular-season standings

Playoffs

Statistics

Players without any appearance are not included.

|-
|colspan="14"|Goalkeepers:
|-

|-
|colspan="14"|Defenders:
|-

|-
|colspan="14"|Midfielders:
|-

|-
|colspan="14"|Forwards:
|-

Goalkeepers

Record = W-L-D

Transfers

In

Out

Honors
2002 WUSA Most Valuable Player of the Year:  Marinette Pichon
2002 WUSA Offensive Player of the Year:  Marinette Pichon
2002 All-WUSA Team:  Marinette Pichon,  Jennifer Tietjen-Prozzo,  Erica Iverson,
2002 WUSA Coach of the Year:  Mark Krikorian

References

External links
 Philadelphia Charge website (archive.org)

Philadelphia Charge
2002 in Philadelphia
American soccer clubs 2002 season
2002 in American sports
2002 Women's United Soccer Association season
Sports in Pennsylvania by year